Sir William Gascoigne (c. 135017 December 1419) was Chief Justice of England during the reign of King Henry IV.

Life and work
Gascoigne (alternatively spelled Gascoyne) was a descendant of an ancient Yorkshire family. He was born in Gawthorp to Sir William Gascoigne and Agnes Franke.

He is said to have studied at the University of Cambridge, but his name is not found in any university or college records. According to Arthur Collins, Gascoigne was a law student at the Inner Temple. It appears from the year-books that he practised as an advocate in the reigns of Edward III and Richard II. When Henry of Lancaster was banished by Richard II, Gascoigne was appointed one of his attorneys, and soon after Henry's accession to the throne was made chief justice of the court of King's Bench. After the suppression of the rising in the north in 1405, Henry eagerly pressed the chief justice to pronounce sentence upon Richard Scrope (Archbishop of York), and the Earl Marshal Thomas Mowbray, who had been implicated in the revolt. This he absolutely refused to do, asserting the right of the prisoners to be tried by their peers. Although both were later executed, Gascoigne had no part in this. It has been doubted whether Gascoigne could have displayed such independence of action without prompt punishment or removal from office.

His reputation is that of a great lawyer who in times of doubt and danger asserted the principle that the head of state is subject to law, and that the traditional practice of public officers, or the expressed voice of the nation in parliament, and not the will of the monarch or any part of the legislature, must guide the tribunals of the country.

The popular tale of his committing the Prince of Wales (the future Henry V) to prison must also be regarded as inauthentic, though it is both picturesque and characteristic. It is said that Gascoigne had directed the punishment of one of the prince's riotous companions, and the prince, who was present and enraged at the sentence, struck or grossly insulted the judge. Gascoigne immediately committed him to prison, and gave the prince a dressing-down that caused him to acknowledge the justice of the sentence. The King is said to have approved of the act, but it appears that Gascoigne was removed from his post or resigned soon after the accession of Henry V. He died in 1419, and was buried in All Saints' Church, the parish church of Harewood in Yorkshire. (This even attracted gazetteers in the 19th century, suggesting his tomb amongst places worthy of visit). Some biographies of him have stated that he died in 1412, but this is disproved by Edward Foss in his Lives of the Judges. Although it is clear that Gascoigne did not hold office long under Henry V, it is not impossible that the scene in the fifth act of Shakespeare's Henry IV, Part 2, (in which Henry V is crowned king, and assures Gascoigne that he shall continue to hold his post), could have some historical basis, and that his resignation shortly thereafter was voluntary.

Family
He was born in Gawthorp - in the valley below Harewood House, in an area later flooded to facilitate the landscape at Harewood (not in Gawthorpe in the West Riding of Yorkshire) - to Sir William Gascoigne and Agnes Franke. He married, firstly, in 1369  Elizabeth de Mowbray (1350–1396), daughter of Alexander de Mowbray, son of Roger de Mowbray, 1st Baron Mowbray. He married, secondly, Joan de Pickering, widow of Henry de Greystock.

The issue by his first marriage were:
Sir William Gascoigne II (1370–1422) m. Joan Wyman.
Elizabeth Gascoigne, m. John Aske
 Margaret Gascoigne, m. Robert Hansard

Issue by second marriage:
Sir Christopher Gascoigne (born 1407)
James Gascoigne (born 1404), ancestor of poet George Gascoigne
Agnes Gascoigne (c. 1401after 1466), m. Robert Constable.
Robert Gascoigne (born c. 1410)
Richard Gascoigne (born c. 1413)

His brother, Nicholas Gascoigne, was ancestor of the Gascoigne baronets. Another brother, Richard (c. 13651423), married Beatrice Ellis, and was possibly the father of Thomas Gascoigne, Chancellor of Oxford University.

In popular culture
Gascoigne is portrayed by Sean Harris in The King (2019 film).

References

14th-century English judges
Lord chief justices of England and Wales
1350s births
1419 deaths
Male Shakespearean characters
15th-century English judges
Knights Bachelor